Shuko Aoyama and Makoto Ninomiya were the defending champions, but chose not to compete together. Aoyama played alongside Yang Zhaoxuan, and successfully defended her title, defeating Monique Adamczak and Storm Sanders in the final 6–0, 2–6, [10–5]. Ninomiya teamed up with Renata Voráčová, but lost to Aoyama and Yang in the semifinals.

Seeds

Draw

Draw

References
Main Draw

Japan Women's Open
2017 Japan Women's Open